Jess & Matt is the self-titled debut studio album by Jess & Matt. The album includes re-recorded tracks they performed on the seventh season of The X Factor Australia, where they came third. The album was released through Sony Music Australia on 16 December 2015, which peaked at number nine on the ARIA Albums Chart. It was preceded by its lead single "Nothing Matters", which debuted at number 29 on the ARIA Singles Chart.

Reception

Lucy Barber-Hancock from Renowned for Sound said; "Jess and Matt provide the kind of well-trained pop vocals which are the ideal blank canvas to carry all of their chosen tunes, whilst still allowing their unique brand of folk-pop to flow right through the album in the form of nifty finger-picked guitars and the pure tone of their vocal acrobatics."

Track listing

Charts

Release history

References

2015 debut albums
Sony Music Australia albums